Colby Tyler Wedgeworth (born July 27, 1985, Sacramento, California, United States) is an American pop/alternative music producer based in Nashville, Tennessee.

Discography 
(Selective)

References

1985 births
Living people
Record producers from California
Record producers from Tennessee
Musicians from Sacramento, California